It Ain't Like In The Movies At All is the sixth studio album of the Croatian rock band Azra, released through Diskoton in 1986.

The triple album was recorded in the Netherlands, after Branimir Štulić had moved to that country.

Track listing

Personnel 
Azra
Branimir Štulić – Guitars, lead vocals
Boris Leiner – Drums

Additional musicians
Stephen Kipp - Bass

Artwork
Francis Picabia – Front Cover
Missing Link - Photography

Production
Theodor Barbarian – Producer
Recorded by Paul v.d. Brom

References
 www.discogs.com

Azra albums
1986 albums
Diskoton albums